Sead "Sejo" Kalač (born 5 October 1964) is a pop-folk singer.

Career
Early in his professional career, he played the accordion in a band called "Paukova mreža" before landing a solo recording deal with the label PGP-RTB (later called PGP-RTS). The band played throughout the then-existing Yugoslavia in places such as restaurants, hotels and discothèques.

His first solo album, Ulica jorgovana (1991), was recorded in Belgrade, Serbia and his second album, Poletimo poletimo (1994), was recorded in Munich, Germany.

The recording of his third album, Alipašin izvor (1999), started in 1995 in Ljubljana, Slovenia but recording was put on hold until 1998. He then recorded a song entitled "Biščanka" and premiered it at a popular music festival in Bihać, Bosnia and Herzegovina.

Kalač has recorded duets with Serbian singer Stoja (a 2003 remake of his 2000 song "Tika tak") and Bosnian singer Šemsa Suljaković ("Lažu te"; first featured on her 2000 album Ne vjerujem nikom više, later re-released on his 2003 album Voda, vazduh i sloboda). Both duets were major successes. Kalač also recorded a song with the Serbian singer Jana called "Sunce sjalo" for her album Malo magije (2005).

He was the inspiration for a cattle character in the 2007 Serbian adult animated comedy film Jet Set.

Personal life
Kalač lives in Offenbach, Germany and possesses Croatian and Serbian passports.

His brother, Caki Kalač, is also a singer.

He is a very distant relative of singer and reality star Muhedin "Čupo" Kalač. Sejo himself was offered to participate in Serbian reality shows Parovi (Couples) and Veliki brat (local production of Big Brother), but he rejected both opportunities, saying he did not want to participate in such a circus.

Discography
Studio albums
Ulica jorgovana (1991); released as "Sead Kalač"
Poletimo poletimo (1994)
Alipašin izvor (1997)
Biščanka (2000)
Dva života (2001)
Baš ti (2002)
Gradski momak (2003)
Ala ala (2004)
O mom rodnom kraju (2007)
Dođe to iz duše (2009)

Compilation albums
Najbolji Hitovi (2011) (Greatest Hits album)

Ulica jorgovana (1991)
Sta su žene pitaj druže mene
Ulica jorgovana
Praznina u duši
Decembar je bio
Opasno je to sto radiš
Zbog tebe se i čaša prolila
Samo ti si ona prava
Neka žive moji stari

Poletimo poletimo (1994)
Poletimo, poletimo
Bol bolujem u tuđini
Volim da kockam
Šeila kćeri mila
Glave lude
Pustite me da se napijem
Digni glavu prijatelju
Majko utješi me

Alipašin izvor (1997)
Alipašin izvor
Merima
Potraži me
Pusti me da živim
Ljuta na mene
Život mi je uništila
Bila si mi prva ljubav
Budi moja ove noći

Bišćanka (2000)
Lele, lele
Pobjegla je sreća
Takva se žena jednom rađa
Emina
Tika tak
Prevariću život
Oprostaj
Biščanka
Ljubi me
Pjesma za tebe
Ljubav i kocka
U krug
Crna udovica

Dva života (2001)
Ne volim da gubim
Uvijek dobro činio sam svima
Lažu da je vino lijek
Mađije
Aman, aman
Alipašin izvor
Sretan ti rođendan
Kapi kiše
Istanbul
Rodila se ljubav
Reci da znam
Eh što nemam dva života
Kajundžijo baci prsten
Svatovska

Baš ti (2002)
Baš ti
Idi ženo iz života moga
Kraljica
To nije fer
Bolje da sam pijan nego lud
Daj mi daj
Imam brata
Kafanska pjevačica

Voda, vazduh i sloboda (2003)
Voda vazduh i sloboda
Polomiću sve sto je od stakla
Fajront
Lažu te (featuring Šemsa Suljaković, song first featured on her 2000 album, Ne vjerujem nikom više)
Ne vjerujem ženi sa plavim očima
Gradski momak
Tika tak (featuring Stoja)
Šeila
Neka pati

Ala, ala (2004)
Ala, ala
Drugovi moji dobri su momci
Da li si me voljela ili nisi
E moj ćale
Bogata sirotica
Daj daj dodaj
A jesam te volio
Ovo je pjesma za tebe ljubavi moja

O mom rodnom kraju (2007)
Alipašin izvor
Bol bolujem
Što nema omladine
Hej plave plave
Ameriko prokleta si
Gdje je omladina
Teško je i meni majko

Dođe to iz duše (2009)
Apsolutno tačno
Dođe to iz duše
Mogu bez tebe
Kupi mi Crnu Goru
Nisam fer
Noćni čovjek
Znaš li, znaš li brate, brate
Sirotinjo
Dođe to iz duše RMX

As featured artist
Lažu te (2000) with Šemsa Suljaković
Sunce sjalo (2005) with Jana

References

External links
Official Website (defunct)
 

1964 births
Living people
People from Peja
Naturalized citizens of Croatia
Kosovan people of Bosniak descent
Bosniaks of Serbia
Bosniaks of Croatia
Serbian people of Kosovan descent
Croatian people of Kosovan descent
20th-century Serbian male singers
Yugoslav male singers
Grand Production artists
BN Music artists
Serbian folk-pop singers
Kosovan singers